Colin Robbins might refer to:
Colin Robbins (Beverly Hills 90210) character
Colin Robbins (software engineer)
Colin Robbins (tennis), South African tennis player